American Spanish may refer to:

 Spanish language in the United States
 Spanish language in the Americas

See also
 Mexican Spanish
 Spanish American, an American with ancestry from Spain
 Hispanic American, an American with ancestry from Spanish America
 Spanish language

Language and nationality disambiguation pages